CDIS may refer to:

 The CDIS (computer-based system) air-traffic control system by Praxis.
 The abbreviated name of Chengdu International School, an international school for expatriate children in Chengdu, China.